Oshane Ximines (born December 7, 1996) is an American football outside linebacker for the New York Giants of the National Football League (NFL). He played college football at Old Dominion.

Early years
Ximines attended Hertford County High School in Ahoskie, North Carolina. During his career, he had 145 tackles and 35 sacks. He committed to Old Dominion University to play college football. His family immigrated to the United States from Jamaica before he was born.

College career
Ximines played as a defensive end at Old Dominion from 2014 to 2018. During his career, he had 176 tackles, 32.5 sacks and one interception.

Professional career

Ximines was drafted by the New York Giants in the third round (95th overall) of the 2019 NFL Draft. He is the first ever player from Old Dominion to be taken in the NFL draft. The Giants previously acquired the selection as part of a trade that sent Odell Beckham Jr. and Olivier Vernon to the Cleveland Browns.

In week 3, against the Tampa Bay Buccaneers, Ximines recorded his first career sack, on Jameis Winston, in the 32–31 win. In week 14 against the Philadelphia Eagles on Monday Night Football, Ximines sacked Carson Wentz twice during the 23–17 overtime loss. In addition, he switched positions from defensive end to outside linebacker.

Ximines entered 2020 as one of the Giants' starting pass rushers. He suffered a shoulder injury in Week 4 and was placed on injured reserve on October 9, 2020. He was designated to return from injured reserve on November 23, 2020, and began practicing with the team again, but underwent season-ending shoulder surgery the next week.

During the 2021 season Ximines was used in a rotational role averaging 23 snaps per game. In Week 8 matchup against the Kansas City Chiefs, Ximines’ offsides penalty negated a fourth quarter interception by Darnay Holmes. Ximines finished the season with 13 tackles.

References

External links
 Old Dominion Monarchs bio
 New York Giants bio

1996 births
Living people
People from Ahoskie, North Carolina
Players of American football from North Carolina
American football defensive ends
American people of Jamaican descent
American football linebackers
Old Dominion Monarchs football players
New York Giants players